In chemistry, dithiadiazoles are a family of heterocyclic compounds with the formula . Although several isomers are possible, the 1,2,3,5-dithiadiazoles have received greater attention. The neutral compounds are radicals with 7 π electrons. Oxidation affords the dithiadiazolium cations.

Chloride salts of diithiadiazolium cation can be prepared by the reaction of nitriles with thiazyl chloride:

References

Sulfur heterocycles
Nitrogen heterocycles
Five-membered rings
Sulfur–nitrogen compounds